The Commander-in-Chief of the Army is the professional head of the Armed Forces of the Republic of Nicaragua. 

On 20 April 1823 José Anacleto Ordóñez would declare Nicaragua's independence in Granada and appointed himself General en Jefe del Ejército, Protector y Libertador de Granada, essentially establishing military absolutism in the state, with himself as the de facto military leader until he was deposed on 19 January 1825.

This military absolutism would be brought back after the assassination of Head of State José Zepeda on 25 January 1837, during the presidency of José Núñez, who appointed Bernardo Méndez de Figueroa as "General Commander of Arms".

List of officeholders

Protector and Liberator of Granada

General Commander of Arms

Commander-in-Chief

References

Nicaragua